Tinsley Ellis (born June 4, 1957) is an American blues and rock musician, who was born in Atlanta, Georgia, United States, and grew up in South Florida.  According to Billboard, "nobody has released more consistently excellent blues albums than Atlanta's Tinsley Ellis. He sings like a man possessed and wields a mean lead guitar."

Rolling Stone said, "On assertive originals and standards by the likes of Jimmy Reed and Junior Wells, Atlanta's Tinsley Ellis unleashes feral blues guitar. Nonstop gigging has sharpened his six-string to a razor's edge…his eloquence dazzles…he also achieves pyrotechnics that rival early Jeff Beck and Eric Clapton."

Biography
His love for electric blues grew by listening to British Invasion bands such as the Yardbirds, the Animals, Cream, and the Rolling Stones. Ellis has stated that the first guitar playing he heard were songs like "Dirty Water" by The Standells, and "Secret Agent Man" by Johnny Rivers, but that he then "got into the real stuff" like Freddie King. Inspired by a live appearance by B.B. King, he was determined to become a blues guitarist. In 1975, he played with the Haygood Band while attending Emory University near Atlanta. Two years later, already an accomplished musician, he returned to Atlanta and joined his first professional blues band, the Alley Cats, a group that included Preston Hubbard of the Fabulous Thunderbirds. Ellis graduated from Emory in 1979 with a degree in history. In 1981, he formed the Heartfixers, with the singer and harmonica player Chicago Bob Nelson. The group recorded three albums for the small Landslide record label, one with the singer, Nappy Brown before breaking up in 1988. The same year, Ellis signed a recording contract with Chicago's Alligator Records.

His debut solo album on Alligator Records, Georgia Blue, was released in 1988. Alligator then reissued two earlier albums, Cool On It and Tore Up (on which the Heartfixers backed Nappy Brown). Ellis' next four releases were Fanning the Flames (1989), Trouble Time (1992), Storm Warning (1994), and Fire It Up (1997). Artists including Peter Buck (of R.E.M.), Derek Trucks, and Chuck Leavell joined him in the studio. He worked with the record producers, Eddy Offord and Tom Dowd.
 
Ellis' reputation and media coverage continued to grow. He appeared on NBC-TV Sports during the network's 1996 Summer Olympics coverage.

Ellis shifted to Capricorn Records in 2000 and released Kingpin. In 2002 he joined Telarc Records, producing two CDs: Hell or High Water and The Hard Way. All the while Ellis never stopped touring. "A musician never got famous by staying home," Ellis says. Ellis claims to have performed live, at least once, in all 50 of the United States.

He returned to Alligator Records in 2005 with the live album, Live! Highwayman. In 2007 he released the studio album, Moment of Truth, followed in 2009 with Speak No Evil. Ellis continues to tour over 150 nights a year around the world.

He has shared stages with Warren Haynes, Widespread Panic, the Allman Brothers Band, Stevie Ray Vaughan, Jimmy Thackery, Otis Rush, Willie Dixon, Son Seals, Koko Taylor, Albert Collins and Buddy Guy.

In early 2013, Ellis was a part of the 'Blues at the Crossroads 2' tour which celebrated the music of Muddy Waters and Howlin' Wolf. The tour also included Kim Wilson and the Fabulous Thunderbirds, James Cotton, Bob Margolin and Jody Williams.

Also in 2013, Ellis launched his own label, Heartfixer Music, and has since released several albums: the all instrumental Get It!, Midnight Blue, Tough Love and, in 2016, Red Clay Soul.

In 2014, Ellis was a guest performer on Eli Cook's album, Primitive Son.

In 2017, Ellis launched a new side project called Tinsley Ellis Blues Is Dead, in which he performs the blues and R&B songs recorded by Grateful Dead and other Fillmore era acts.

Commenting on Ellis's album, Ice Cream in Hell, AllMusic stated "On Ice Cream in Hell, Ellis' songwriting and singing finally match the prowess in his playing, and we are all richer for it."

Discography
1982 – Featuring Chicago Bob Nelson (with The Heartfixers)
1986 – Cool on It (with The Heartfixers)
1988 – Georgia Blue
1989 – Fanning the Flames
1992 – Trouble Time
1994 – Storm Warning
1997 – Fire it Up
2000 – Kingpin
2002 – Hell or High Water
2004 – The Hard Way
2005 – Live! Highwayman
2007 – Moment of Truth
2009 – Speak No Evil
2013 – Get It!
2014 – Midnight Blue
2015 – Tough Love
2016 – Red Clay Soul
2018 – Winning Hand
2020 – Ice Cream In Hell
2022 - Devil May Care

Compilations
1996 – A Celebration of Blues: The New Breed

References

External links

Tinsley Ellis at Alligator Records

Tinsley Ellis Interview on TheWaster.com
The Daily Times Tinsley Ellis Interview/review
Tinsley Ellis Bluesquest interview
 

1957 births
Living people
American blues guitarists
American male guitarists
American blues singers
Musicians from Atlanta
Capricorn Records artists
Guitarists from Georgia (U.S. state)
20th-century American guitarists
20th-century American male musicians
Southland Records artists
Alligator Records artists